David Wayne Thompson (born February 1, 1949) is a former American football offensive lineman who played five seasons in the National Football League (NFL) with the Detroit Lions and New Orleans Saints. He was drafted by the Lions in the second round of the 1971 NFL Draft. He played college football at Clemson University and attended Valley High School in Fairax, Alabama. Thompson was also a member of the Tampa Bay Buccaneers.

References

External links
Just Sports Stats

Living people
1949 births
Players of American football from Alabama
American football offensive linemen
Clemson Tigers football players
Detroit Lions players
New Orleans Saints players
People from Valley, Alabama